Ulvsunda is a district in Bromma in western Stockholm, just east of Stockholm Bromma Airport, built around Ulvsunda Castle, a 17th-century castle.

Galleries

Old photos

Modern photos

References

External links
Stockholm city website: Ulvsunda data (pdf)
Ulvsunda villaägareförening [householders association]

Further reading
Bernhardsson, Siv (ed. Göran Söderström), 2003: Stockholm utanför tullarna: nittiosju stadsdelar i ytterstaden, pp. 439 443. Stockholm: Stockholmia förlag (Libris link) 

Districts in Västerort